Jewel Cianeh Taylor (née Howard; born 17 January 1963) is a Liberian politician who is currently serving as the 30th vice president of Liberia. She was married to convicted warlord and former president Charles Taylor (whom she married in 1997, but later divorced in 2006) and was First Lady of Liberia during his presidency. In 2005, Jewel Taylor was elected to the Senate of Liberia for Bong County as a member of the National Patriotic Party. She served as the Chairperson of the Senate Health and Social Welfare Committee on Gender, Women and Children.

Life and career
While her husband was president, Taylor held a number of official posts in the Liberian government, including Deputy Governor of the National Bank of Liberia (forerunner to the current Central Bank of Liberia), President of the Agriculture Cooperative and Development Bank (ACDB) and Mortgage Financing Underwriter of the First Union National Bank. In addition, she focused on educational, health and social projects. 

Taylor holds a graduate degree in banking and two bachelors' in banking and economics. She is currently enrolled in the MBA program at Cuttington University in Liberia. On 21 December 2011, she graduated from the Louise Arthur Grimes School of Law of the state-owned University of Liberia.  Two days later, a public dispute arose in Bong County regarding honors allegedly given her; she was announced to be the new holder of the title "Madam Suakoko", an honorary Bong County title memorializing the namesake of the Suakoko District, but members of the group that had supposedly awarded her the title soon began denying that the award had been given by their group, saying that the meeting at which she was awarded the title was actually a meeting to help county residents overcome political differences.

In February 2012, Taylor attempted to introduce legislation into the Liberian parliament that would have made homosexual activity a first degree felony carrying the death penalty as the maximum punishment. The legislation was not passed after President Ellen Johnson Sirleaf made it clear she would not sign any such bill.

In 2017, Jewel was chosen by George Weah as his running mate on the newly formed Coalition (CDC) ticket. Following a run up in late 2017, she became the first female Vice President of Liberia when her party won the elections.

In 2020, she was infected with COVID-19 and was flown to Ghana for treatment.

References

|-

|-

1963 births
Living people
Members of the Senate of Liberia
First ladies and gentlemen of Liberia
Cuttington University alumni
Congress for Democratic Change politicians
21st-century Liberian women politicians
National Patriotic Party politicians
People from Bong County
21st-century Liberian politicians
University of Liberia alumni
Vice presidents of Liberia
Women vice presidents